Guðnason is a surname of Icelandic origin, meaning son of Guðni. In Icelandic names, the name is not strictly a surname, but a patronymic. The name refers to:
Guðni Ólafur Guðnason (b. 1965), Icelandic professional basketball player
Haukur Ingi Guðnason (b. 1978), Icelandic professional football player
Hilmir Snær Guðnason (b. 1969), Icelandic stage and film actor

Icelandic-language surnames